Richard Edmund Kelfa-Caulker (March 1909 – April 2, 1975) was a Sierra Leonean diplomat.

Career 
In 1929 he was Printing Instructor at the Albert Academy in Freetown.
From 1931 to 1937 studied at a College in the U.S.A.
In 1938 he was a Senior Tutor at the Albert Academy in Freetown.
From 1939 to 1959 he was Principal of the Albert Academy.
From 1959 to 1961 he was Commissioner for Sierra Leone and Gambia in London.
From  to 1964 he was Ambassador in Washington, D.C.
From 1964 to 1966 he was High Commissioner (Commonwealth) in London (United Kingdom).
From 1969 to 1973 he was Ambassador to Monrovia (Liberia).

References

1909 births
Ambassadors of Sierra Leone to the United States
High Commissioners of Sierra Leone to the United Kingdom
High Commissioners of Sierra Leone to Nigeria
Oberlin College alumni
People from Moyamba District
1990 deaths